Space Zap is a space-themed fixed shooter arcade video game developed by Game-A-Tron and licensed to Midway Manufacturing in 1980. Space Zap shipped in three form factors: standard upright, cocktail, and Bally's Mini-Myte reduced size cabinet. The player controls the defenses of an immobile base at screen center. The base is attacked from four sides, and the player must rapidly press one of four corresponding buttons to fire in the direction of an incoming attacker.

An official port of Space Zap for the Bally Astrocade was released in 1981 as Space Fortress.

Gameplay
The goal is to defend a base anchored in the center of the screen from alien attackers that shoot from the four cardinal directions  There are four buttons, each corresponding to one of the attack directions. If a projectile ("mine") comes from the left, the player presses the left button, and so on. If the player fails to fire in time, the base explodes. After the player successfully defends the base they encounter an attack satellite that flies around the  until the player hits it or satellite hits the base. The player starts out with three lives at the beginning of the game.

The game allows up to two players, taking turns. The cocktail table version has two sets of controls, one on either side of the machine.

The player receives points when they shoot a mine or, if lucky, hit the alien ship itself. The points values are 250 for shooting a mine, 500 for the ship, and 2,000 for the attack satellite. The player receives an extra base at the scores of  150,000, and 300,000.

Legacy
Cosmic Ark, published by Imagic in 1982 for the Atari 2600, started out as a clone of Space Zap. In the final game, the first part of each level is Space Zap played with an Atari CX40 joystick, but a second sequence was added to keep it from being repetitive.

Space Zap clones are numerous and include Outpost (1981) for the Apple II, Colorzap (1982) for the TRS-80 Color Computer, Cyclon (1983) for the VIC-20, and Starship Pegasus (1984) for the TI-99/4A.

References

1980 video games
Arcade video games
Fixed shooters
Midway video games
Video games developed in the United States